Emmanuel Anaful (born 17 February 2000) is a Ghanaian footballer who currently plays as a defender for Ghana Premier League side Cape Coast Ebusua Dwarfs.

Career 
Anaful started his Ghana Premier League career with Ebusua Dwarfs in October 2019 ahead of the 2019–20 season. He made his debut on 29 December 2019, playing the full 90 minutes in a 3–1 loss to Medeama. In his first season, he established himself as one of the two key centre-backs in the team as he started 14 of the 15 league matches played before the league was cancelled due to the COVID-19 pandemic in Ghana.

He made his first start of the 2020–21 season, during the opening match of the season in the process playing the full time as Dwarfs drew 2–2 against their rivals Elmina Sharks. His standout performance for the club came in June 2021, after helping Ebusua Dwarfs to clean sheets and victories over Aduana Stars and International Allies. In both matches, he was adjudged the man of the match. He also made two assists in matches that month. For his stellar performances he was nominated for the GPL NASCO Player of the Month for June, which was later won by Augustine Boakye. At the end of the season, he started 28 of 29 league matches he played.

References

External links 

 
 

Living people
2000 births
Association football midfielders
Ebusua Dwarfs players
Ghana Premier League players
Ghanaian footballers